Denis Braidotti (born 31 July 1972) is an Italian international judoka.

After his career with the Italian national team, he moved to Malta in 2019 to become the head coach of the Maltese national team.

Braidotti is 6th Dan judoka.

Achievements

References

 

1972 births
Living people
Italian male judoka
Mediterranean Games gold medalists for Italy
Mediterranean Games bronze medalists for Italy
Mediterranean Games medalists in judo
Competitors at the 1997 Mediterranean Games
Competitors at the 2001 Mediterranean Games
Judoka of Centro Sportivo Carabinieri
20th-century Italian people
21st-century Italian people